The 2012 Men's Junior European Volleyball Championship was the 23rd edition of the Men's Junior European Volleyball Championship, organised by Europe's governing volleyball body, the CEV. It was held Gdynia, Poland and Randers, Denmark from August 24 to September 2, 2012.

Italy won their 3rd title in the tournament by defeating Spain. Sandro Caci was elected the Most Valuable Player.

Participating teams
 Host
 
 
 Defending Champion
 
 Qualified through 2012 Men's Junior European Volleyball Championship Qualification

Venues

Preliminary round
All times are Central European Summer Time (UTC+02:00)

Pool I

Pool II

Final round
All times are Central European Summer Time (UTC+02:00)

5th–8th place

5th–8th semifinals

7th place match

5th place match

Final

Semifinals

3rd place match

Final

Final standing

Individual awards

Most Valuable Player

Best Scorer

Best Spiker

Best Blocker

Best Server

Best Setter

Best Receiver

Best Libero

References

External links
 Confédération Européenne de Volleyball 

Men's Junior European Volleyball Championship
European Championship
International volleyball competitions hosted by Poland
International volleyball competitions hosted by Denmark
2012 in Danish sport
2012 in Polish sport
2012 in youth sport
August 2012 sports events in Europe
September 2012 sports events in Europe